Paropakaram is a 1953 Indian Tamil-language film directed by Kamal Ghosh. The film stars Ramesh Sharma and Savithri.

Cast 
List adapted from the database of Film News Anandan.

Male cast
Ramesh Sharma
C. S. R.
Mukkamala
Relangi
 C. V. V. Panthulu
R. Nageswara Rao

Female cast
G. Varalakshmi
Savithri

Production 
The film was directed was by Kamal Ghosh who also handled the cinematography. Editing was done by Prakash and Kandasamy. Devaki Bose wrote the story and Udhayakumar wrote the dialogues. Art direction was done by Kotvankar. R. N. Nagaraja Rao carried out the still photography. The film was shot and processed at Vijaya Vauhini Studios.

The film was produced simultaneously in Telugu with the same title.

Soundtrack 
Music was composed by Ghantasala while the lyrics were penned by Kavi Lakshmanadas. Playback singers are A. M. Rajah, Ghantasala, M. Satyam, P. Leela and A. P. Komala.

References

External links 

Indian drama films
Indian black-and-white films
Films scored by Ghantasala (musician)
1950s Tamil-language films
1953 drama films